The seventh season of the American animated television series The Simpsons originally aired on the Fox network between September 17, 1995, and May 19, 1996. The show runners for the seventh production season were Bill Oakley and Josh Weinstein who would executive produce 21 episodes this season. David Mirkin executive produced the remaining four, including two hold overs that were produced for the previous season. The season was nominated for two Primetime Emmy Awards, including Outstanding Animated Program and won an Annie Award for Best Animated Television Program. The DVD box set was released in Region 1 on  December 13, 2005, Region 2 on January 30, 2006, and Region 4 on March 22, 2006. The set was released in two different forms: a Marge-shaped box and also a standard rectangular-shaped box in which the theme is a movie premiere.

Production
The season was the first season executively produced by Bill Oakley and Josh Weinstein, who had written episodes for previous seasons. They were chosen partly because they had been with the show since the third season and understood many of its dynamics. When they took over the series they wanted many of the episodes to be realistic ones that focused more on the five members of the Simpson family, exploring their feelings and emotions towards each other. They also wanted to produce a Treehouse of Horror episode, episodes about Sideshow Bob, Itchy & Scratchy and several "format-bending" episodes such as "22 Short Films About Springfield". Their preferred choice of guest stars were those with unique and interesting voices, and several of their guest stars were "old grizzled men with distinctive voices" such as R. Lee Ermey, Donald Sutherland, Kirk Douglas and Lawrence Tierney.

David Mirkin, who had been executive producer for the previous two seasons, was credited as a consulting producer for the seventh season but also executive produced the episodes "Who Shot Mr. Burns? (Part Two)", "Radioactive Man", "Lisa the Vegetarian" and "Team Homer". Steve Tompkins, Dan Greaney, Richard Appel and Rachel Pulido received their first writing credits while Spike Feresten and Jack Barth received their only writing credits this season. Although the majority of the writing staff stayed on for the next season, both Greg Daniels and Brent Forrester received their last writing credits during season seven. Jon Vitti, who had left following the fourth season, returned to write "Home Sweet Homediddly-Dum-Doodily" as well as "The Simpsons 138th Episode Spectacular". Wes Archer, a long-time director for The Simpsons who helped define the look of the show, left following this season. Dominic Polcino and Mike B. Anderson, who had previously worked on the show as part of the animation staff, both directed their first episodes.

Doris Grau, script supervisor for the show and voice of Lunchlady Doris died on December 30, 1995. The episode "Team Homer", which aired eight days later, was one of the last episodes to feature her voice and featured a dedication to her. After that, Lunchlady Doris had speaking parts in "Lisa's Sax", which Grau had recorded before her death. From season nine until season eighteen, she appeared only as a background character but had a speaking role in "The Mook, the Chef, the Wife and Her Homer" where she was voiced by Tress MacNeille.

The season started off with the heavily publicized "Who Shot Mr. Burns? (Part Two)", which was the resolution to the first part, which had been a cliffhanger. It was preceded by "Springfield's Most Wanted", a TV special hosted by John Walsh, host of America's Most Wanted and was parody of Walsh's television series, this special was designed to help people find out who shot Mr. Burns, by laying out the potential clues and identifying the possible suspects. The special was criticized for taking the publicity of the episode too far. Several critics said the special tainted Walsh's credibility and was described as gimmicky, tacky and "blatant groveling for viewers".

The episode "Lisa the Vegetarian" features one of the few permanent character changes in the series when Lisa officially becomes a vegetarian. The episode had been pitched by David S. Cohen and the producers felt it would be a surefire way to get Paul McCartney to guest star. McCartney agreed, but only on the condition that Lisa stay a vegetarian and not revert. "22 Short Films About Springfield" has twelve credited writers, the most of any episode of the series. The episode features multiple stories about different characters. To decide who would write each of the segments, all of the writers chose their top three favorite characters and put them into a hat, the names were drawn out and the writers were assigned their parts and Greg Daniels put all of the segments together and ordered them. The only major recurring characters who were introduced this season were Disco Stu, who appeared in "Two Bad Neighbors," and Brandine Spuckler, who appeared in "Scenes from the Class Struggle in Springfield". Two more episodes, "You Only Move Twice" and "El Viaje Misterioso de Nuestro Jomer" were produced as part of the season seven (3Fxx) production run, but both aired the following season.

The episode "22 Short Films About Springfield" was originally written for being the pilot episode of a potential Simpsons spin-off series entitled Springfield Stories or simply Springfield. The proposed show was planned to be focused on the town in general, rather than the Simpson family. Every week would be a different scenario: three short stories, an adventure with young Homer or a story about a background character that was not tied into the Simpson family at all. The idea never came to anything, as Groening realized that the staff did not have the manpower to produce another show as well as The Simpsons.

This season also featured the episode "Mother Simpson". Which changed the end credits for a shot of Homer sitting on the hood of his car, after his mother leaves his life again.

Voice cast & characters

Main cast
 Dan Castellaneta as Homer Simpson, Grampa Simpson, Krusty the Clown, Groundskeeper Willie, Barney Gumble, Santa's Little Helper, and various others
 Julie Kavner as Marge Simpson, Patty Bouvier, Selma Bouvier and various others
 Nancy Cartwright as Bart Simpson, Nelson Muntz, Ralph Wiggum and various others
 Yeardley Smith as Lisa Simpson
 Harry Shearer as Mr. Burns, Waylon Smithers, Ned Flanders, Principal Skinner, Lenny Leonard, Kent Brockman, Reverend Lovejoy, George H. W. Bush, and various others
 Hank Azaria as Moe Szyslak, Chief Wiggum, Professor Frink, Comic Book Guy, Apu, Bumblebee Man and various others

Recurring
 Pamela Hayden as Milhouse van Houten, Jimbo Jones
 Maggie Roswell as Maude Flanders, Helen Lovejoy and Miss Hoover
 Russi Taylor as Martin Prince and Sherri and Terri
 Tress MacNeille as Agnes Skinner
 Marcia Wallace as Edna Krabappel
 Frank Welker as various animals

Guest stars

 Phil Hartman as Troy McClure, Lionel Hutz, Fat Tony, and  the hospital board chairman (various episodes)
 Tito Puente as himself ("Who Shot Mr. Burns")
 Mickey Rooney as himself ("Radioactive Man")
 Paul and Linda McCartney as themselves ("Lisa the Vegetarian")
 Paul Anka as himself ("Treehouse of Horror VI")
 Glenn Close as Mona Simpson("Mother Simpson")
 Harry Morgan as Bill Gannon ("Mother Simpson")
 Kelsey Grammer as Sideshow Bob("Sideshow Bob's Last Gleaming")
 R. Lee Ermey as Colonel Leslie Hapablap ("Sideshow Bob's Last Gleaming")
 Lawrence Tierney as Don Brodka ("Marge Be Not Proud")
 Tom Kite as himself ("Scenes from the Class Struggle in Springfield")
 Bob Newhart as himself ("Bart the Fink")
 Donald Sutherland as Hollis Hurlbut ("Lisa the Iconoclast")
 Kirk Douglas as Chester J. Lampwick ("The Day the Violence Died")
 Alex Rocco as Roger Meyers Jr. ("The Day the Violence Died")
 Jack Sheldon as the Amendment ("The Day the Violence Died")
 Suzanne Somers as herself ("The Day the Violence Died")
 Jeff Goldblum as MacArthur Parker ("A Fish Called Selma")
 Joe Mantegna as Fat Tony ("Much Apu About Nothing")
 Peter Frampton as himself ("Homerpalooza")
 Cypress Hill as themselves ("Homerpalooza")
 The Smashing Pumpkins as themselves ("Homerpalooza")
 Sonic Youth as themselves ("Homerpalooza")
 Christina Ricci as Erin ("Summer of 4 Ft. 2")

Reception
On Rotten Tomatoes, the seventh season of The Simpsons has a 100% approval rating based on 6 critical reviews.

Awards
In 1996, "Treehouse of Horror VI" was submitted for the Primetime Emmy Award in the "Outstanding Animated Program (For Programming less than One Hour)" category. They had submitted it because it had a 3D animation sequence, which the producers felt gave them an edge. However, the episode lost to Pinky and the Brain that year, and Bill Oakley later regretted submitting the episode because he felt that a more emotional episode like "Mother Simpson", "Lisa the Vegetarian" or "Bart Sells His Soul" would have had a better chance of winning. Alf Clausen, Bill Oakley and Josh Weinstein were also nominated for "Outstanding Individual Achievement in Music and Lyrics" for the song "Señor Burns" from "Who Shot Mr. Burns? (Part Two)".

The series won several other awards for this season, including an Annie Award for "Best Animated Television Program". "Lisa the Vegetarian" won both an Environmental Media Award for "Best Television Episodic Comedy" and a Genesis Award for "Best Television Comedy Series, Ongoing Commitment". Although "Treehouse of Horror VI" failed to win the Emmy, the "Homer³" segment was awarded the Ottawa International Animation Festival grand prize.

In 1996, The Simpsons became the first animated series to win a Peabody Award, and won it "for providing exceptional animation and stinging social satire, both commodities which are in extremely short supply in television today."

At the 12th annual Television Critics Association Awards, the seventh season of the show was nominated for 'Outstanding Achievement in Comedy,' but lost to "Frasier."

Episodes

DVD release

The DVD boxset for season seven was released by 20th Century Fox Home Entertainment in the United States and Canada on December 13, 2005, nine years after it had completed broadcast on television. As well as every episode from the season, the DVD release features bonus material including deleted scenes, Animatics, and commentaries for every episode. After the criticism of the Season 6 set only being sold in a plastic packaging molded to look like Homer's head, which did not match the plain rectangular cardboard packagings of the first five seasons, Season 7 was offered in two packagings: A plastic packaging molded to look like Marge's head, and a standard rectangular cardboard box featuring Marge posing for a photo at a movie premiere. The menus continue the same format from the fifth and sixth seasons, and the menus use a Hollywood theme that show various characters at a movie premiere.

Notes

References

Bibliography

External links

Simpsons season 07
1995 American television seasons
1996 American television seasons